Connor Zary (born September 25, 2001) is a Canadian professional ice hockey centre currently playing for the Calgary Wranglers in the American Hockey League (AHL) as a prospect to the Calgary Flames of the National Hockey League (NHL). Zary was selected 24th overall by the Flames in the 2020 NHL Entry Draft.

Playing career

Junior 
Following three standout seasons with the Kamloops Blazers of the Western Hockey League, Zary was widely seen as a top prospect newly eligible for the 2020 NHL Entry Draft. The NHL Central Scouting Bureau rated Zary as the 15th-best North American skater eligible for selection in 2020.

At the draft, which was rescheduled to October 6, 2020 from its usual date in late June, Zary was selected by the Calgary Flames with the 24th overall pick. On December 31, 2020, Zary was signed by the Flames to a three-year, entry-level contract.

Career statistics

Regular season and playoffs

International

References

External links 
 

2001 births
Living people
Calgary Flames draft picks
Calgary Wranglers players
Canadian ice hockey forwards
Ice hockey people from Saskatchewan
Kamloops Blazers players
National Hockey League first-round draft picks
Sportspeople from Saskatoon
Stockton Heat players